Caught on Camera with Nick Cannon is an American documentary reality television show on NBC. The show premiered on Friday, December 19, 2014. The show is hosted by Nick Cannon and it tells stories that are captured on cell phones, dash cams, security cams, and by news crews from around the world. The second season premiered on January 22, 2016. A third season premiered on October 14, 2016. The series officially ended on December 30, 2016. Also included are popular videos from Vine.

Episodes

Series overview

Season 1 (2014–15)

Season 2 (2016)

Season 3 (2016)

Notes

References

External links 
 
 

2014 American television series debuts
English-language television shows
NBC original programming